The Afon Rheidol is a river in Ceredigion, Wales,  in length. The source is Plynlimon.

Geography and geology

The Rheidol rises in the headwaters of the Nant-y-moch Reservoir  on the western flanks of Plynlimon, near the sources of the Wye and Severn. After flowing south to Ponterwyd on the increasingly deep valley, then southwest through Welsh Oak ancient woodland, it veers westwards to its confluence with the Afon Mynach, at Devil's Bridge, Ceredigion (lit. "bridge on the Mynach") and a spectacular waterfall. The river continues passing the abandoned workings of the Cwm Rheidol lead mine; one of many other metal mines in the valleya source of extracted metal pollution of the river and flows westwards before its confluence with the Afon Ystwyth and the estuary at Aberystwyth to drain into Cardigan Bay. 

In the late 1960s, when the mine was closed, a major blowout of water contained in an adit coloured the whole river an ochre orange colour and greatly added to the concentrations of lead and zinc in the river. Today, management of water still draining from the mine is by the use of constructed wetlands. Previous management had included a limestone filter bed installed in the 1960s and now redundant. The filter bed is still in place and can be seen from the road.

Environment
The catchment of the Rheidol is dominated by the western maritime exposure of this part of Wales. Rainfall levels are high and ecosystems reflect both high rainfall and the acidic nature of the underlying rocks. Combined with the acid mine drainage from abandoned silver and lead mines that sit within the catchment (the area around Aberystwyth contains 38 of the 50 worst polluting metal mines in Wales), by 1991 the river had regularly broken EEC pollution limits for heavy metal contamination such as zinc.

Upland Molinia spp. grassland is common growing on deep deposits of peat. Within the valleys, dense and ancient oak forests with rich understoreys of ferns, mosses and lichens are common. In the valley bottom, glacial and alluvial deposits have been worked by man into low intensive agriculture.

Economy

For many centuries the economy of the Rheidol valley had been metal mining. This has now been replaced by forestry, tourism and the farming of beef, dairy cattle and sheep.

There are a number of tourist attractions in the Rheidol valley. These include the Devil's Bridge waterfalls where three bridges, each built over the previous, span the top of a most spectacular waterfall.

Between Devil's Bridge and Aberystwyth runs a narrow-gauge steam railway – the Vale of Rheidol Railway. This was originally built to ship metal ore from the mines but now provides a very popular tourist route into the top end of the Rheidol valley.

A large stag shape on the valley wall is a scheduled ancient monument and is supposedly one of two stag hill figures in the United Kingdom, the other being at Mormond Hill in Scotland. It is however a lead mining waste feature which merely resembles a stag and not a true hill figure. The spoil from the Gelli mine was initially poured down the valley side to form the 'head and horns'. When the mine reopened at the turn of the 20th Century for zinc production, a tramway was built along the base of the original spoil and across. The dumping of spoil from this venture created the body and legs.

References

Aberystwyth
Elenydd
Rheidol